Count Josias I of Waldeck-Eisenberg (18 March 1554 – 6 August 1588), was since 1578 Count of Waldeck-Eisenberg.

In the ten years of his short reign, Josias began to reform the long overdue state administration, including the regulation of the churches, which aimed to strengthen the internal affairs of the state and thus achieve a clear independence of the county and a separation from Hesse. To solve the problems of the time, however, a longer reign of Josias would have been necessary, as well as a like-minded attitude of the other counts of Waldeck. Among them he took the leading position.

Biography

Josias was born at Eisenberg Castle on 18 March 1554 as the sixth child of Count Wolrad II ‘the Scholar’ of Waldeck-Eisenberg and Countess Anastasia Günthera of Schwarzburg-Blankenburg. Josias’ two older brothers, Francis and Henry William, died at a young age. Josias was well educated and disciplined. From his youth he rejected excessive drinking and is said to have forbidden it to others. He entered the court in Kassel in 1570 and initially served Landgrave William IV of Hesse-Kassel. There he met Elector Augustus of Saxony, who employed him only a few months later. Josias took part in military campaigns in East Frisia. He did not return to Waldeck until February 1577. After the death of his father in 1578, Josias took over the government of the part of the county that was allocated to him. Furthermore, he was still in the service of the Elector of Saxony and travelled to Dresden several times.

Already at the beginning of his reign, he succeeded in creating an important accent, whose unifying direction was, however, tempered by confessional differences. The 15-year old Count  himself attended the school which was opened in 1579. Because of the Protestant orientation, however, there were differences of opinion, as a result of which some of the renowned professors left the school in 1586 and moved to the Calvinist-oriented Academia Nassauensis in Herborn. Josias, on the other hand, oriented himself towards orthodox Lutheranism.

A contribution to the internal consolidation of the county and its sovereignty was the land ordinance of 1581, which, however, was only a police ordinance and not yet comprehensive legislation, which was only worked on in the 17th century. In order to strengthen his desire for independence, Josias had appointed qualified civil servants who no longer acted in the interests of Hesse but in the interests of the county.

Josias could not finish his work. He died suddenly and unexpectedly on 6 August 1588 at Eisenberg Castle, where guests from the baptism of his fourth child, Wolrad IV, were still staying. He was succeeded by his underage sons Christian and Wolrad IV, who were under the guardianship and regency of their mother and Count .

Marriage and issue
Josias married in 1582 to Countess Mary of Barby and Mühlingen (Magdeburg, 8 April 1563 – , 19/29 December 1619), daughter of Count Albrecht X of Barby and Mühlingen and Princess Mary of Anhalt-Zerbst. Josias’ widow remarried on 19 November 1592 to Count George III of Erbach. She was buried next to Josias in the Saint Nicholas Church in Korbach on 5 January 1620.
From the marriage of Josias and Mary, the following children were born:
 Mary Anastasia (31 March 1584 – 5 March 1585).
 Count Christian (Eisenberg Castle, 24/25 December 1585 – Waldeck Castle, 31 December 1637), succeeded his father as Count of Waldeck-Eisenberg in 1588. Married in Wildungen in november 1604 to Countess Elisabeth of Nassau-Siegen (Dillenburg Castle, 8 November 1584 – , 26 July 1661).
 Juliane (11 April 1587 – Erbach Palace, 28 February 1622), married in Erbach on 2 March 1606 to Count Louis I of Erbach (Erbach, 3 September 1579 – Erbach, 12 April 1643).
 Count Wolrad IV (Eisenberg Castle, 7 July 1588 – Arolsen, 6 October 1640), succeeded his father as Count of Waldeck-Eisenberg in 1588. Married in Durlach on 8 September 1607 to Margravine Anne of Baden-Hochberg (Hochberg, 13 November 1587 – 11 March 1649).

Ancestors

Notes

References

Sources

External links
 Count Josias of Waldeck-Eisenberg. In: rootsweb.
 Descendants of Wolrad I Gf von Waldeck in Waldeck. In: Genealogy.eu by Miroslav Marek.
 Josias Graf v. Waldeck-Eisenberg. In: WW-Person database by Herbert Stoyan.
 Waldeck. In: An Online Gotha, by Paul Theroff.

1554 births
1588 deaths
Josias 01, Count of Waldeck-Eisenberg
16th-century German people